Oxydoras is a genus of thorny catfishes native to tropical South America.

Species 
There are currently three recognized species in this genus:
 Oxydoras kneri Bleeker, 1862
 Oxydoras niger (Valenciennes, 1821) (Ripsaw catfish)
 Oxydoras sifontesi Fernández-Yépez, 1968

Description
Oxydoras species are relatively large, reaching between 70–100 centimetres (28–40 in) in length.

References

Doradidae
Fish of South America
Catfish genera
Taxa named by Rudolf Kner
Freshwater fish genera